WVMS may refer to:

 WVMS (FM), an FM radio station licensed to Sandusky, Ohio; rebroadcaster of Cleveland's WCRF-FM
 WMSC (FM), an FM radio station in Upper Montclair, New Jersey, formerly known as WVMS
 An acronym for Welsh Valley Middle School